Taranovo is a rural locality (a village) in Fominskoye Rural Settlement, Gorokhovetsky District, Vladimir Oblast, Russia. The population was 13 as of 2010.

Geography 
Taranovo is located 51 km southwest of Gorokhovets (the district's administrative centre) by road. Lisino is the nearest rural locality.

References 

Rural localities in Gorokhovetsky District